Dominik Duda (born 3 March 1995) is a Czech footballer who plays for Senica in the Fortuna Liga as a midfielder.

Club career

FK Senica
Duda made his Fortuna Liga debut for Senica against iClinic Sereď on 13 June 2020. Duda was featured in the starting-XI but was replaced in the second half by Filip Černák.

References

External links
 FK Senica official club profile 
 Futbalnet profile 
 
 

1995 births
Living people
People from Znojmo
Czech footballers
Association football midfielders
SFC Opava players
FK Blansko players
ŠK Slovan Bratislava players
1. FK Příbram players
FK Senica players
Moravian-Silesian Football League players
3. Liga (Slovakia) players
Slovak Super Liga players
Expatriate footballers in Slovakia
Czech expatriate sportspeople in Slovakia
Expatriate footballers in Austria
Czech expatriate sportspeople in Austria
Sportspeople from the South Moravian Region